Daniel García Córdova (born October 28, 1971) is a Mexican race walker. He was born in Mexico City, Mexico.

Personal bests
 20 km: 1:18:27 hrs – Poděbrady, 19 April 1997
 50 km: 3:50:05 hrs – Atlanta, Georgia, 2 August 1996

International competitions

*: Started as a guest out of competition.

References
 
 

1971 births
Living people
Athletes from Mexico City
Mexican male racewalkers
Olympic male racewalkers
Olympic athletes of Mexico
Athletes (track and field) at the 1992 Summer Olympics
Athletes (track and field) at the 1996 Summer Olympics
Athletes (track and field) at the 2000 Summer Olympics
Pan American Games silver medalists for Mexico
Pan American Games medalists in athletics (track and field)
Athletes (track and field) at the 1995 Pan American Games
Athletes (track and field) at the 1999 Pan American Games
Medalists at the 1995 Pan American Games
Medalists at the 1999 Pan American Games
Universiade gold medalists in athletics (track and field)
Universiade gold medalists for Mexico
Medalists at the 1993 Summer Universiade
Medalists at the 1995 Summer Universiade
Central American and Caribbean Games gold medalists in athletics
Central American and Caribbean Games gold medalists for Mexico
Competitors at the 1993 Central American and Caribbean Games
Competitors at the 1998 Central American and Caribbean Games
Goodwill Games medalists in athletics
Competitors at the 1998 Goodwill Games
World Athletics Championships medalists
World Athletics Championships winners
World Athletics Race Walking Team Championships winners
Russian Athletics Championships winners
20th-century Mexican people